Peripatopsis alba, the white cave velvet worm, is a species of velvet worm in the family Peripatopsidae. This species has 18 pairs of clawed legs, with the last pair reduced, and no eyes. Specimens range from 32 mm to 48 mm in length. Like other velvet worms in this genus, this species exhibits matrotrophic viviparity, that is, mothers in this genus retain eggs in their uteri and supply nourishment to their embryos, but without any placenta.

Distribution and habitat 
Peripatopsis alba is a troglobiont known only from two cave systems on Table Mountain, South Africa; Wynberg Cave and Bats Cave.

One other troglobitic velvet worm species is known; Speleoperipatus spelaeus, from Pedro Cave and Swansea Cave, Jamaica.

Conservation 

This species is very rare and listed as Vulnerable on the IUCN Red List due to its restricted distribution and the potential occurrence of human collection and disturbance.

References 

Animals described in 1931
Blind onychophorans
Endemic fauna of South Africa
IUCN-assessed onychophorans
Onychophorans of temperate Africa
Onychophoran species
Troglobitic onychophorans